Woodrow Procter (29 November 1921 – 26 July 2003) was a South African cricketer. He played in two first-class matches for Eastern Province between 1938 and 1940. His sons, Anthony and Mike, also played first-class cricket, with Mike playing Test cricket for South Africa.

References

External links
 

1921 births
2003 deaths
South African cricketers
Eastern Province cricketers
Place of birth missing